The 1932–33 CHL season was the second season of the Central Hockey League, a minor professional ice hockey league in the Midwestern United States. Five teams participated in the league, and the Eveleth Rangers won the championship.

Regular season

External links
Season on hockeydb.com

1932 in ice hockey
1933 in ice hockey